Aman Chetri (born 26 July 2001) is an Indian professional footballer who plays as a striker  for Oil India FC.

Career
Aman was part of the India U-16 team which had participated in the 2016 AFC U-16 Championship. 
Aman was part of the AIFF Elite Academy batch that was preparing for the 2017 FIFA U-17 World Cup to be hosted in India. Aman made his professional debut for the side in the Arrow's first match of the 2019–20 season against Gokulam Kerala. He started and played full match as Indian Arrows lost 0–1.

Career statistics

Honours

India U-20
OFC Youth Development Tournament: 2019

References

2001 births
Living people
Sportspeople from Guwahati
Indian footballers
Indian Arrows players
Oil India FC players
Footballers from Assam
I-League players
India youth international footballers
Association football forwards
Chennaiyin FC B players
Chennaiyin FC players
Indian Super League players